Ivan Babanovski (born in 1941 in Kumanovo) is a Macedonian intelligence officer.

Bibliography

Reference list

See also
 UDBA
 KOS
 MSSI
 ASC
 IA

External links

Radio Ilinden
YouTube 
Преку Скопје муслиманите ќе ја освојуваат Европа

1941 births
Living people
People from Kumanovo
Macedonian Christians
Macedonian writers